Fly Creek Historic District is a national historic district located at Fly Creek in Otsego County, New York.

It encompasses 111 contributing buildings, three contributing sites, and 88 contributing structures.  The district incorporates three hamlet clusters: 
 Pail Shop Corners, 
 Village of Fly Creek (unincorporated), 
 Marvin Mills, 
collectively known as "Fly Creek."

The district includes the separately listed Fly Creek Grange No. 844 and Fly Creek Methodist Church.

It was listed on the National Register of Historic Places in 2006.

References

Historic districts on the National Register of Historic Places in New York (state)
Houses on the National Register of Historic Places in New York (state)
Historic districts in Otsego County, New York
National Register of Historic Places in Otsego County, New York